Expanded Universe, The New Worlds of Robert A. Heinlein is a 1980 collection of stories and essays by American writer Robert A. Heinlein. The trade paperback 1981 edition lists the subtitle under other Heinlein books as More Worlds of Robert A. Heinlein because the contents subsume the 1966 Ace Books collection, The Worlds of Robert A. Heinlein. The current volume is dedicated to William Targ.

Contents
The book collects many short stories and essays, with a foreword for each.  They are:

 Forward 
 "Life-Line" (*)
 "Successful Operation"
 "Blowups Happen" (*)
 "Solution Unsatisfactory" (*)
 "The Last Days of the United States"
 "How to Be a Survivor"
 "Pie from the Sky"
 "They Do It with Mirrors"
 "Free Men" (*)
 "No Bands Playing, No Flags Flying"
 "A Bathroom of Her Own"
 "On the Slopes of Vesuvius"
 "Nothing Ever Happens on the Moon"
 "Pandora's Box" (*)
 "Where To?" (1950, 1965, 1980)
 "Cliff and the Calories"
 "Ray Guns and Rocket Ships"
 "The Third Millennium Opens"
 "Who Are the Heirs of Patrick Henry?"
 "Pravda Means Truth"
 "Inside Intourist"
 "Searchlight" (*)
 "The Pragmatics of Patriotism"
 "Paul Dirac, Antimatter, and You"
 "Larger than Life", a memoir in tribute to E. E. "Doc" Smith
 "Spinoff", about NASA spinoff technologies
 "The Happy Days Ahead"

The six items marked with (*) appeared in The Worlds of Robert A. Heinlein.

When divided into two volumes, Volume 1 concludes with "On the Slopes of Vesuvius", and Volume 2 picks up with "Nothing Ever Happens on the Moon".

Reception
Greg Costikyan reviewed Expanded Universe in Ares Magazine #8 and commented that "Expanded Universe is a book for the completist, the Heinlein devotee, and those interesting in seeing what Heinlein the man, rather than Heinlein the writer, actually believes."

Reviews
Review by Spider Robinson (1980) in Analog Science Fiction/Science Fact, May 1980
Review by Alexei Panshin (1981) in Omni, April 1981
Review by Joseph Nicholas (1981) in Paperback Inferno, Volume 4, Number 6
Review by Jack Williamson (1981) in Omni, July 1981
Review by Andrew Andrews (1981) in Science Fiction Review, Fall 1981
Review by Dave Langford (1981) in Foundation, #23 October 1981
Review by Tom Easton (1981) in Analog Science Fiction/Science Fact, October 12, 1981

References

External links
 
 

1980 short story collections
Short story collections by Robert A. Heinlein
Ace Books books